Poland–Spain relations are cultural and political relations between Poland and Spain. Both nations are members of NATO, the European Union, OECD, OSCE, the Council of Europe and the United Nations.
Spain has given full support to Poland's membership in the European Union and NATO.

Historical relations
First contact between the Kingdoms of Poland and Spain date to Late Middle Ages, where merchants, travelers and Jesuits traveled between both countries. Early Polish diplomats in Spain in the 16th century included Johannes Dantiscus and Piotr Dunin-Wolski. While the Polish and Spanish forms of governments evolved in a different direction, the diplomacy of both countries was more likely to support one another than not. In 1557, Queen Bona Sforza of Poland made a loan to King Philip II of Spain, most of which was never repaid, despite Polish diplomatic efforts and requests (see Neapolitan sums). In 1639 the two kingdoms signed a military treaty; however, it has not been implemented. Polish writer and translator Andrzej Chryzostom Załuski was a Polish diplomat in Spain in the 1670s. Spain was the only country to protest over the First Partition of Poland, and in 1795, following the final Third Partition of Poland, Spanish diplomat Don Domingo de Yriarte was one of the last foreign diplomats to vacate his post in Warsaw.

During the Peninsular War (1809–1814) in Spain, a number of Polish soldiers fought on the side of Napoleon. The Vistula Legion gained fame at the Battle of Saragossa. The Polish Chevau-léger regiment distinguished itself at the Battle of Somosierra in 1808. In February 1864, Spanish authorities arrested in Málaga a Polish ship with arms and ammunition, which had been organized by Polish émigré activists in Western Europe to support the ongoing Polish January Uprising in partitioned Poland. In the 1930s a number of Polish volunteers participated in the Spanish Civil War on the Republican side and were primarily assigned to the Dabrowski Battalion.

Poland and Spain re-established diplomatic relations on 30 May 1919, after Poland regained independence in the aftermath of World War I. During World War II, Spain remained neutral and did not participate in the war directly. Despite pressure from Germany, Spain did not close the Polish embassy, which was thus still able to represent the Polish government-in-exile. The Honorary Consulate of Poland in Barcelona organized temporary accommodation, false documents and transport for Polish civilians and military who fled from France to Spain in 1939–1942 with the intention of reaching the Polish-allied United Kingdom. In 1945, the German occupation of Poland ended and the country's independence was restored, although with a Soviet-installed puppet communist regime. Relations between Poland and Spain were not re-established until 31 January 1977, as the government of the People's Republic of Poland refused to recognize the Falangist government of General Francisco Franco. After the Autumn of Nations and formation of a new, non-communist Polish government, both countries signed a Treaty of Friendship and Cooperation in 1992. In 1998, both countries signed a Common Polish-Spanish Declaration. Since 2003, irregular bilateral conferences between prime ministers of both nations take place; as of 2012 eight such meetings have taken place.

April 12, 2010, was declared a day of national mourning in Spain to commemorate the 96 victims of the Smolensk air disaster, including Polish President Lech Kaczyński and his wife Maria Kaczyńska.

High-level visits

Presidential and Prime Ministerial visits from Poland to Spain
 Prime Minister Tadeusz Mazowiecki (1990)
 President Aleksander Kwaśniewski (2003)
 Prime Minister Kazimierz Marcinkiewicz (2006)
 President Lech Kaczyński (2008)
 Prime Minister Donald Tusk (2011 and 2013)
 President Bronisław Komorowski (2011)
 Prime Minister Ewa Kopacz (2015)
 Prime Minister Mateusz Morawiecki (2021)

Royal and Prime Ministerial visits from Spain to Poland
 King Juan Carlos I of Spain (1989 and 2001)
 Prime Minister José María Aznar (2004 and 2007)
 Prime Minister José Luis Rodríguez Zapatero (2009)
 Crown Prince Felipe (2012)
 Prime Minister Mariano Rajoy (2012, 2014, 2016)
 Prime Minister Pedro Sánchez (2018, 2022)

Cultural relations

Certain ties in Polish and Spanish cultures can be explained by the fact that Poland and Spain had the highest percentage of petty nobility in Europe (hidalgos, szlachta), which encouraged ties between educated elites, and mutual references. Even more importantly, both countries also shared a strong Catholic history, on the frontier of struggles against Islamic conquest (Antemurale Christianitatis, Reconquista). Spain had a significant influence on Polish culture, particularly in literature. Spanish works have been translated into Polish and Spain was a setting of some famous Polish works such as The Manuscript Found in Saragossa, and influenced major Polish literary figures, such as Juliusz Słowacki.

In the 21st century both governments promoted their partner's culture at home, with the Polish Year in Spain in 2002 and the Spanish Year in Poland in 2003. There are Cervantes Institutes in Warsaw and Kraków, and a Polish Institute in Madrid. Spain is a popular tourist destination for Poles, with about half a million of Poles visiting Spain each year. The Spanish language is a popular foreign language in Poland.

Polish community in Spain
Spain has an estimated Polish community of 100,000 people, many who arrived to Spain after  World War II and after Poland joined the European Union in 2004.

Trade
In 2017, trade between Poland Spain totaled €8 billion Euros. Poland's main exports to Spain include: automobile, machinery, pharmaceutical products, electronics and furniture. Spain's main exports to Poland include: automobiles, electrical equipment, electronics and machinery. In 2016, Spanish companies invested €171 million Euros in Poland, becoming the 6th largest foreign direct investor in the country.

Resident diplomatic missions

 Poland has an embassy in Madrid, and a consulate-general in Barcelona.
 Spain has an embassy in Warsaw.

Honorary consulates
There are honorary consulates of Poland in Burgos, Las Palmas, Málaga, Murcia, Pamplona, Valencia and Vigo, and honorary consulates of Spain in Gdańsk, Kraków and Wrocław.

See also
 Foreign relations of Poland
 Foreign relations of Spain
 Dabrowski Battalion
 Poles in Spain
 Poland in the European Union

Notes

Further reading
 Gabriela Makowiecka, Po drogach polsko-hiszpańskich, Wydawnictwo Literackie, Kraków, 1984

External links
 Bak, Grzegorz, La imagen de España en la literatura polaca del siglo XIX [Recurso electrónico] : (diarios, memorias, libros de viajes y otros testimonios literarios) / Grzegorz Bak ; director, Fernando Presa González, Madrid:  Universidad Complutense de Madrid, Servicio de Publicaciones,  2004
 BIBLIOGRAFÍA DE INTERÉS HISPANO-POLACO. En la biblioteca Guillermo Cabrera Infante (Instituto Cervantes de Varsovia)
 Beata Wojna, Stosunki polsko-hiszpańskie w Unii Europejskiej, Biuletyn PISM, nr 18 (263), 2005-03-03
 Polonia.es - page of the Polish minority in Spain
 Bilateral cooperation, Polish Embassy in Madrid, Spain

 
Spain
Bilateral relations of Spain